This is a list of albums associated with the manga and anime series Zetsuai 1989, its dojinshi prequel Dokusen Yoku and its sequel Bronze: Zetsuai Since 1989.  The albums were released between 1988 and 1996.

Calekka
, sometimes called Karekka, is a music album, released on November 6, 1988 and dedicate to yaoi doujinshi series . Dokusen Yoku or Desire to Monopolize were published under the CLUB DOLL circle and it was one of the longest series by Minami Ozaki, the creator of Zetsuai 1989. The yaoi line is developed between Kojiro Hyuga and Ken Wakashimazu, football players from Captain Tsubasa anime and manga.

The album mostly consists of songs performed by Japanese singers Suzuki Hiroaki, Tsubakura Yuiko and Shinichi Ishihara. It also contains one Drama CD track and two instrumental tracks.

List of tracks
 – 03:36
by Shinichi Ishihara
 – 03:37
 – 05:06
by Suzuki Hiroaki
 – 02:54
Drama CD
 ROMANTIC DANCE – 04:09
by Tsubakura Yuiko
 – 04:52
by Shinichi Ishihara
 – 04:15
by Shinichi Ishihara
 – 02:51
by Suzuki Hiroaki
 – 03:32
by Shinichi Ishihara
 – 03:55

Zetsuai 1989

 – music album, released in Japan on July 25, 1990. This album is based on manga and do not include anime soundtrack. Songs are performed by Ishihara Shinichi.

 – 04:57
 – 04:08
 – 04:23
 – 04:51
 – 03:18
 – 04:34
 – 03:46
 – 05:30
 – 03:43
 – 04:47

Zetsuai 1989 version 2
 – second version, released on September 9, 1992, after the appearance of the first Zetsuai OVA. This time the singer is Shō Hayami, Kouji Nanjo's voice actor.

Zetsuai MEGAMIX – 04:23
 – 01:02
 – 04:24
 – 01:20
 – 01:30
 – 04:34
D – 02:01
 – 04:24
 – 03:27
 – 03:39
Bad blood – 03:58
Sweet slaughter – 04:55
Jesus Christ Love For You – 03:43

"Bad Blood", performed by Hayami Show, was also released as single album on October 14, 1992. It consists of four tracks:
BAD BLOOD – 03:58
SWEET SLAUGHTER – 04:26
BAD BLOOD -karaoke version- – 03:58
SWEET SLAUGHTER -karaoke version- – 04:26

Zetsuai DramaMix 1993
Zetsuai DramaMix 1993 – music album and Drama CD, based on five Zetsuai 1989 manga volumes. Released March 10, 1993.

The Best of Minami Ozaki
The Best of Minami Ozaki – compilation album of Hayami Sho, Suzuki Hiroaki, Tsubakura Yuiko, Shinichi Ishihara (from Calekka Original Album), Minamoto Yuka.

 – 04:34
Jesus Christ Love For You – 05:37
 – 04:57
 – 4:08
 – 04:51
Lock – 03:18
 – 04:34
 – 03:46
 – 03:46
 – 04:47
 – 03:36
 – 05:06
 – 02:54
ROMANTIC DANCE – 04:06
 – 04:52
 – 03:32

Bronze - Kouji Nanjo

 – Kouji Nanjo's songs from manga performed by Shinichi Ishihara. Album was released on January 29, 1992, together with the first Bronze manga volume.

Albinoid Junction – 05:32
 – 03:10
Endless Desire – 03:45
 – 03:28
Bridge – 05:11
Giant Step – 03:19
BRONZE – 03:50
 – 06:09
Epilogue

CD also includes two bonus tracks: "Zetsuai Megamix 1992 -English Version-" and "Zetsuai Megamix 1992".

Bronze Original Soundtrack

 – original soundtrack for the second OVA – Bronze, released on December 18, 1996 under Victor Entertainment label. The singers are Hayami Show and Inoue Takehide (credited as TAKEHIDE). "Bronze – End", sometimes called "Bronze -Final Chapter-", is the ending theme of Bronze OVA.

 – 04:12
 – 04:09
 – 05:42
 – 05:29
 – 03:31
 – 01:48
 – 00:51
 – 02:07
 – 04:54
 – 01:23
 – 01:20
 – 01:18
 – 01:19
 – 05:00
 – 02:18
 – 00:51
 – 02:36
 – 03:24
 – 06:19

 was released as single album on February 21, 1996 and consists of four tracks:
BRONZE 殉教
SCAPE GOAT
BRONZE 殉教 〜off vocal ver.
SCAPE GOAT 〜off vocal ver.

Bronze Endmax

The packaging for this mini-CD was made up as though it really had been recorded by Nanjo Koji, but once again Hayami Show was the actual vocal performer.  The three songs on it were used for the Cathexis music video OAV, along with Bad Blood and Jesus Christ Love for You from the Zetsuai 1989 Type 2 album.

20XX ZETSU-AI～CRIME OF PASSION～ – 05:58
 – 04:40
 – 05:11

Notes

External links
Minami Ozaki Discography 
Dokusen Yoku, collection of doujinshi anthologies (description)
Page dedicated to Dokusen Yoku series
Bronze OST and Bronze Martyrdom singe  on Victor Entertainment official website.
"Bronze – End" translation
Info on Bronze Endmax

Anime soundtracks
Film and television discographies
Discographies of Japanese artists